Sherman is the northernmost and least populous town of Fairfield County, Connecticut, United States. The population was 3,527 at the 2020 census. The town was formed  in 1802 from the northern part of New Fairfield.  It is named for Roger Sherman, the only person who signed all four founding documents of the United States of America.   He also had a cobblers shop in the north end of town which has been reconstructed behind the Northrup House in the center of town.

Sherman has been named "Best Small Town in Connecticut" three times by Connecticut Magazine.

The Appalachian Trail goes through the northern end of Sherman. Part of Squantz Pond is in the town.

Sherman is a popular weekend retreat for New York City residents, with about a third of its residents weekenders.

Sherman has one area on the National Register of Historic Places: the Sherman Historic District, bounded roughly by the intersection of Old Greenswood Road and Route 37, northeast past the intersection of Route 37 East and Route 39 North and Sawmill Road. The district was added to the National Register on August 31, 1991.

Sherman is the only town in Fairfield County in the 860 area code; the remainder of the county is served by the area code 203/area code 475 overlay.

History

The land which is now called Sherman was formerly occupied primarily by native people of Algonquian lineage.

In 1724, colonial settlers from Fairfield, Connecticut, received approval from the General Assembly of the Colony of Connecticut to establish a new township. According to one account, they negotiated with Chief Squantz of the Schaghticoke tribe. Alternatively, it is told that they did not negotiate with Chief Squantz because he moved to the north end of Squantz Pond land area and refused to "sell" the township of New Fairfield. They returned in the spring of 1725, but found that Chief Squantz had died during the winter. His four sons and heirs refused to sign the deeds. It was not until four years later that the white men called "The Proprietors" finally got the drawn marks of several other native people who may not have had authority to sell the land. They "purchased" a 31,000-acre tract of land that is now New Fairfield and Sherman, for 65 pounds sterling, the equivalent of about 300 dollars, on April 24, 1729. The deed was recorded on May 9, 1729, and is now deposited in the archives of the State Capitol in Hartford, Connecticut.

Education
There is one public school in Sherman, the Sherman School. Its enrollment is about 325 students from pre-school to grade 8. There is no high school in Sherman; students instead are given a choice of five high schools that Sherman will pay for them to attend (New Milford High School, New Fairfield High School, Henry Abbot Tech, Shepaug Valley High School, and Nonnewaug High School).

Notable people

 Mikhail Baryshnikov (born 1948), lived in Sherman for a time with his family
 Blackleach Burritt (1744–1794), clergyman in the American Revolution
 Martha Clarke (born 1944), American director and choreographer
 Vinnie Colaiuta (born 1956), drummer, owned a home in town for a short time
 Malcolm Cowley (1898–1989), 20th century literary critic, lived in a converted barn for many years
 Eleanor Fitzgerald (1877–1955), anarchist editor and theatre professional, lived in Sherman for many years
 Jerry Foley, T.V director and producer has a home in Sherman, where he lives with his wife Ann-Marie and son Quinn
 Arshile Gorky (1904–1948), abstract expressionist painter, lived in Sherman on Spring Lake Road. He is buried in North Cemetery in town
 Daryl Hall (born 1946), musician lives in Sherman
 Bob Iger (born 1951), former CEO of Disney, has a home in Sherman
 Durward Kirby (1911–2000), co-star of Candid Camera and Garry Moore Show had a home on Lake Mauweehoo in Sherman from 1951 to 2001
 Howard Schatz (born 1940), American photographer and ophthalmologist
 Jeffrey Toobin (born 1960), American lawyer, author and legal analyst for CNN
 Diane von Furstenberg (born 1946), fashion designer has a house in the area
 Scott Wise and his wife, Elizabeth Parkinson, choreographers and dancers, live in Sherman
 George Wunder (1912–1987), artist for 26 years on Terry and the Pirates
 Rob Zombie (born 1965), musician and film director lives in Sherman

Geography
Sherman is bordered by New Fairfield to the south, New Milford to the east, Kent to the north, and by Pawling, New York to the west.

Naromiyocknowhusunkatankshunk Brook

Sherman is the location of Naromiyocknowhusunkatankshunk Brook (29 letters), in the north end of town near the New Milford border. The name of indigenous origin means "water flowing from the hills". The Naromi Land Trust in Sherman derived its name from the brook.

In some deeds it is called Deep Brook. For some time the brook was officially known as Morrissey Brook, but an official name change was put into Public Act 01-194, "An Act Concerning Certain Real Property Transactions," which was approved July 11, 2001. The 29-letter name was noted in an 1882 book, History of the Towns of New Milford and Bridgewater, 1703–1882, by Samuel Orcutt.

Candlewood Lake
Candlewood Lake stretches from Danbury in the south, north to Sherman at a park named Veterans' Field. The lake is the largest in Connecticut.  It is artificial, created for the Rocky River hydro electric power plant in New Milford on the Housatonic River. The water is pumped through a large pipe into the lake.

Squantz Pond
Sherman bounds the north end of Squantz Pond, which was a natural pond that was expanded with the creation of Candlewood Lake.

Sherman Center
The town center is listed as the Sherman Historic District in the National Register of Historic Places. It was designated in 1991 for its historic architecture including several houses, the town hall, school, and manufacturing facilities.

Demographics

As of the census of 2010, the population was 3,581 people, including 3,469 white, 35 Asian, 15 black, 1 Native American, 16 other, and 45 of two or more races. 76 of these people identified as Hispanic or Latino.

The income per capita is $55,920, which includes all adults and children. The median household income is $118,750.

There were 1,388 households, 460 of which contained children under 18.

Government

Sherman tends to lean Republican in presidential elections. Lyndon B. Johnson won the town by 13 points in his presidential victory in 1964. In 2008, Barack Obama managed to edge John McCain by just under four points.

In popular culture
Sherman is the location where a presidential candidate becomes possessed by the Devil (and/or sells his soul) in the novel "The Hell Candidate" by Graham Masterton (writing under the name "Thomas Luke") (Pocket Books 1980; currently out-of-print).

Another Graham Masterton novel, "Spirit" (Dorchester Publishing Co. 2001, copyright 1995), is a ghost story set in Sherman in the 1940s and 1950s.

References

External links

Town of Sherman official website

 
Towns in Fairfield County, Connecticut
Towns in the New York metropolitan area
Towns in Connecticut